A charrette, often Anglicized to charette or charet and sometimes called a design charrette, is an intense period of design or planning activity.

The word charrette may refer to any collaborative process by which a group of designers draft a solution to a design problem, and in a broader sense can be applied to the development of public policy through dialogue between decision-makers and stakeholders.

In a design setting, whilst the structure of a charrette depends on the problem and individuals in the group, charrettes often take place in multiple sessions in which the group divides into sub-groups.  Each sub-group then presents its work to the full group as material for further dialogue. Such charrettes serve as a way of quickly generating a design solution while integrating the aptitudes and interests of a diverse group of people. The general idea of a charrette is to create an innovative atmosphere in which a diverse group of stakeholders can collaborate to "generate visions for the future".

Origin
The word charrette is French for "cart" or "chariot." Its use in the sense of design and planning arose in the 19th century at the École des Beaux-Arts in Paris, where it was not unusual at the end of a term for teams of student architects to work right up until a deadline, when a charrette would be wheeled among them to collect up their scale models and other work for review. The furious continuation of their work to apply the finishing touches came to be referred to as working en charrette, "in the cart." Émile Zola depicted such a scene of feverish activity, a nuit de charrette or "charrette night," in L'Œuvre (serialized 1885, published 1886), his fictionalized account of his friendship with Paul Cézanne. The term evolved into the current design-related usage in conjunction with working right up until a deadline.

Examples
Charrettes take place in many disciplines, including land use planning, or urban planning.  In planning, the charrette has become a technique for consulting with all stakeholders.  This type of charrette (sometimes called an enquiry by design) typically involves intense and possibly multi-day meetings, involving municipal officials, developers, and residents.  A successful charrette promotes joint ownership of solutions and attempts to defuse typical confrontational attitudes between residents and developers.  Charrettes tend to involve small groups, however the residents participating  may not represent all the residents nor have the moral authority to represent them.  Residents who do participate get early input into the planning process.   For developers and municipal officials charrettes achieve community involvement, may satisfy consultation criteria, with the objective of avoiding costly legal battles. Other uses of the term "charrette" occur within an academic or professional setting, whereas urban planners invite the general public to their planning charrettes.  Thus most people (unless they happen to be design students) encounter the term "charrette" in an urban-planning context.

In fields of design such as architecture, landscape architecture, industrial design, interior design, interaction design, or graphic design, the term charrette may refer to an intense period of work by one person or a group of people prior to a deadline. The period of a charrette typically involves both focused and sustained effort. The word "charrette" may also be used as a verb, as in, for example, "I am charretting" or "I am on charrette [or: en charrette]," simply meaning I am working long nights, intensively toward a deadline.

An example of a charrette occurred in Florida in 1973 when the future residents of the Miccosukee Land Co-op in Tallahassee traveled by auto caravan to Orlando and spent the weekend at the offices of the King Helie Planning Group of Orlando (sleeping on the floor) working with its staff to develop the community's land use plans; features desired by individual members and acceptable to the group included a perfectly circular lot, a huge treehouse lot, and streets named after Beatles songs (such as "The Long and Winding Road". "Penny Lane", "Abbey Road"). A more recent example, from New College of Florida, is their Master Plan Design Charrettes that took place over a week in 2005 involving students, alumni, administrators, professors, area residents, and local government staff members as well as architects, designers, and planners from Moule & Polyzoides, The Folsom Group, the Florida House Institute for Sustainable Development, Hall Planning & Engineering, and Biohabitats in a process to make long-range suggestions for the campus layout, landscaping, architecture, and transportation corridors of the master plan for its campus.

In some cases, a charrette may be held on a recurring basis, such as the annual charrette held by the Landscape Architecture and Environmental Planning department at Utah State University. Each February, the faculty choose a site in partnership with communities and groups throughout Utah, and hold an intense five-day design charrette focusing on particular issues in that community or region. The charrette begins with a field visit, followed by all-day work sessions accompanied by project stakeholders and volunteer landscape architects and other professionals, and overseen by senior and graduate level students. The final work is then presented to the community. Charrettes such as these offer students and professionals the opportunity to work together in a close setting on real-world design scenarios, and often provide communities with tens of thousands of dollars of design work for free.

The Schools of Architecture at Rice University and at the University of Virginia call the last week before the end of classes Charrette. At the final deadline time (assigned by the school), all students must put their "pencils down" and stop working. Students then present their work to fellow students and faculty in a critiqued presentation.

Many municipalities around the world develop long-term city plans or visions through multiple charrettes - both communal and professional.  Notable successes on the west coast of Canada include the city of Vancouver, British Columbia , as well as the District of Tofino. Tofino won an Award of Excellence in Planning after a successful multi-day charrette.

As dramatised for the film The Best of Enemies (2019), in 1971 a charette was used to address inter-racial tensions in order to facilitate school desegregation in the city of Durham, North Carolina.

See also
Barn raising
Shturmovshchina
Talkoot
Workshop

External links
Online Compendium of Free Information for the Community Based Urban Design Process CharretteCenter.net
The Neighborhood Charrette Handbook University of Louisville's Sustainable Urban Neighborhoods Program (SUN)
A Handbook for Planning and Conducting Charrettes for High Performance Projects U.S. Department of Energy | Office of Energy Efficiency and Renewable Energy
"PUBLIC INVOLVEMENT TECHNIQUES FOR TRANSPORTATION DECISION-MAKING: CHARRETTES, US Dept of Transportation.

References

Civil society
Community building
Group decision-making
Design
Group processes
Urban studies and planning terminology